2015 AC Nagano Parceiro season.

J3 League

References

External links
 J.League official site

AC Nagano Parceiro
AC Nagano Parceiro seasons